The women's 400 metres hurdles event at the 2002 Asian Athletics Championships was held in Colombo, Sri Lanka on 10–12 August.

Medalists

Results

Heats

Final

References

2002 Asian Athletics Championships
400 metres hurdles at the Asian Athletics Championships
2002 in women's athletics